Audio Up Media is a podcast studio and network in Los Angeles, California founded in 2020 by Jared Gutstadt, formerly of Jingle Punks. In its first two years of operation, Audio Up has produced more than 30 podcasts with artists and celebrities including Stephen King, James Ellroy, Machine Gun Kelly, Michael Cohen, Anthony Anderson, Miranda Lambert, JaVale McGee and Jason Alexander.

The majority of podcasts are scripted musicals with original scores which Gutstadt calls "a movie for your ears." "We start with the songs and then we build the stories around them," Gutstadt says. This reverse engineering allows Audio Up to incubate artists and to develop IP for television, films, and musicals.

In 2020, Gutstadt was awarded Adweek's "Podcast Innovator of the Year" and "Podcast Producer of the Year."

The company counts MGM and Primary Wave as early investors.

History 
In 2019, Gutstadt conceived the idea for podcast studio while recording Bear and a Banjo with super-producer Jason "Poo-Bear" Boyd.

In what series narrator Dennis Quaid describes as "a true fiction of American music," Bear and a Banjo follows the unlikely duo of Bear (Boyd) and Banjo (Gutstadt), who are placed in pivotal moments of American musical history à la the 1994 film Forrest Gump.

Bear and a Banjo was named one of Variety's Best Music Podcasts of 2019. The accompanying album was produced by T Bone Burnett with a lyrical contribution from Bob Dylan.

In January 2020, after completing an earn-out with Jingle Punks, Gutstadt founded Audio Up with headquarters in Brentwood. In May 2020, the company received a 4.5 million-dollar investment from MGM Studios which includes a first-look deal at adaptations.

Notable Shows

Mea Culpa 
In September 2020, Trump's former lawyer and personal fixer Michael Cohen launched the podcast Mea Culpa as part of his "redemption tour" with Audio Up and Meidas Touch.

The podcast hosts a variety of guests including Ben Stiller, Rosy O'Donnell, and Stormy Daniels. It is hosted from Cohen's home where he is currently under house arrest. By August 2021, Mea Culpa received more than 10 million downloads.

Make It Up as We Go 
Released in October 2020, Audio Up's first scripted podcast follows the story of an aspiring young songwriter, played by Scarlett Burke, who moves to Nashville to chase her country music dreams.

Burke herself had moved to Nashville with a songbook, but was reluctant to tour. Gutstadt suggested that they record her songs and then form a narrative around her experiences in Nashville's writers' rooms. A dramatized version of her own story would form the basis of the podcast. In November 2020, facts merged with fiction when Miranda Lambert recorded "Champion," a song that Burke had written for Make It Up As We Go."The goal of the podcast is breaking a big old song; that's what I do every day. This is just another outlet for that." —Bobby Bones, executive producerWritten by David Hudgins (Friday Night Lights, Parenthood, and Game of Silence) and Brooks Hudgins, Make It Up As We Go's cast also includes Billy Bob Thornton, Dennis Quaid, Craig Robinson and Bobby Bones. Lindsay Ell and Miranda Lambert make appearances as themselves in addition to contributing original music.

A Webby Award nominee, the show received a 4.8-star review on Apple Podcasts before it was green-lighted for a second season.

Halloween in Hell 
The four-part series, released in October 2020, features Machine Gun Kelly, 24kGoldn, Dana Dentata, iann dior and phem playing fictional characters of themselves competing in the "most evil singing game show of all time" with Tommy Lee appearing as Satan. According to Kelly, "Jared [Gutstadt] came with the whole vision and script. I just lent my voice." The podcast amassed over one million streams in its four-week run. It also resulted in MGK's single "Love Race" which peaked at No. 9 on Billboard and was co-written by Gutstadt.

Strawberry Spring 
Stephen King partnered with Audio Up Media, iHeart Media, and producer Lee Metzger (The Voice) to create Strawberry Spring, a new show based on a tale from his 1978 short story collection Night Shift. The series follows a journalist as he hunts for a serial killer named Springheel Jack. Metzger wrote and directed, while the show stars Garrett Hedlund, Milo Ventimiglia, Herizen F. Guardiola, Sydney Sweeney, Ken Marino, and Al Madrigal.
Upon its release Strawberry Spring went to No. 1 across all scripted podcast platforms and has stayed at No. 1 for the entirety of its run.

Shows Forthcoming

Sonic Leap (2021) 
Sonic Leap continues Audio Up's goal of artist discovery through Hero the Band, four brothers from Atlanta who cross styles, genres, and time barriers.

Sonic Leap invents a fake origin story for the band—a storyline, reminiscent of Back to the Future—in which the brothers, steeped in 80s new wave artists, meet a time-traveling guru (played by Anthony Anderson of Black-ish fame) who sends them back to 1985 where they can earn their proper stardom. The show also stars emo-rap superstar Trippie Redd in the role of the high school bully.

"2020 should have been an epic year for Hero the band," Gutstadt says, "with opportunities to be part of major festivals, touring globally, and having people discover their music — but with Covid-19, we are now leaning into the idea of an origin story in the form of a fictional podcast. The podcast is about a band that believes they've 'arrived' at the wrong time in history. So we turned back the clock in Sonic Leap, and sent them to the feel-good 1980s."

The show was conceived by Gutstadt and written and directed by Zach Selwyn for a late 2021 release.

Uncle Drank: the Totally Hammered Podcast (2021) 
The 8-part comedy music special will feature Gary Busey as Uncle Drank, a free-spirited beach musician, "one-part Kenny Chesney and one-part Kenny Powers," a fictional superstar who is "widely known as the inventor of beach-country and trop rock."

"Uncle Drank is truly an offshoot of Gary's personality," Gutstadt says. "When we pitched it to him, he said that 'no acting would be required.' Many people don't know this, but Gary was a musician first. He played with Leon Russell as his drummer, he was friends with Waylon Jennings and people like T Bone Burnett, plus he wrote music for Robert Altman's iconic Nashville."

Gutstadt wrote the music, which will include performances by Trinidad James, Luke Wilson, Kinky Friedman, Blanco Brown and others.

Hollywood Death Trip (2021) 
Hollywood Death Trip stars famed crime-fiction writer James Ellroy (L.A. Confidential, The Black Dahlia) narrating his own true-life crime reporting of memorable mid-century murders.

The podcast was picked up by Audible Originals and was released on July 7, 2022.

Playboy Interview (2021) 
The series is based on the classic Playboy Interview, which started in 1962 with Alex Haley's conversation with Miles Davis.

Set to premiere in September 2021, the Playboy Interview will feature a slew of stars including Rosanna Arquette as Betty Friedan, Taye Diggs as Muhammad Ali, Gael García Bernal as Salvador Dalí, Michael Shannon as Tennessee Williams, Shea Whigham as John Wayne, Maya Hawke as Helen Gurley Brown, Kevin Corrigan as Frank Sinatra, and Gina Gershon as Oriana Fallaci.

Midnight at the Sun Diner (2022) 
The Sun Records story gets a classic re-imagining from Audio Up—taking the studios legendary roster of artists (Elvis Presley, Johnny Cash, Jerry Lee Lewis, Howlin Wilf, Roy Orbison, Carl Perkins and more) and modernizing the story of the legendary Memphis studio for a new audience.

Bedtime Stories of the Ingleside Inn (2022) 
Jason Alexander stars as Mel Haber, the legendary owner of the Palm Springs Hollywood getaway "The Ingleside Inn." In what can be described as a historical musical fiction, Haber's autobiography served as a launching pad for this series, which was produced by Academy Award winner Michael Sugar (Spotlight) and co-stars Michael McKean, Richard Kind and more.

Haber was known to entertain guests like Frank Sinatra, Liz Taylor and more during his nearly 40-year-run as the sole owner of the establishment.

References 

Podcasting companies
Companies based in Los Angeles